Stavky is a settlement in Horlivka Raion of Donetsk Oblast of eastern Ukraine, at 40.3 km NNE from the centre of Donetsk city.

The settlement was taken under control of pro-Russian forces during the War in Donbass, that started in 2014.

Demographics
Native language as of the Ukrainian Census of 2001:
Ukrainian 29.41%
Russian 70.59%

References

Villages in Horlivka Raion